Bukan is a city in the Central District of Bukan County, West Azerbaijan province, Iran, and serves as capital of the county. At the 2006 census, its population was 149,340 in 32,588 households. The following census in 2011 counted 170,600 people in 43,269 households. The latest census in 2016 showed a population of 193,501 people in 56,944 households. The city is situated east of the Siminarud river. The whole county is populated by Shafi'i Kurds who speak Sorani Kurdish.

During the Qajar dynasty, due to the attention and residence of Aziz Khan Mokri and her family, Bukan became important.The history of this city is related to four government figures known as Sardar Aziz Khan family. Bukan was the center of governance and their residence. After the 1978 revolution, it flourished in social, cultural, sports, economic and political indicators. This city is one of the most important and effective cities in Iran.

Etymology
The name Bukan derives from  the Kurdish word 'brides'. However, Rashid al-Din Hamadani wrote that the name was eponymous to a Merkit prince. Only during the Qajar era is the name documented.

Geography

Mountains
Nalishkêne mountain, in the  Zagros Mountains range.

History

Pre–Islamic era
There have been several artefacts discovered in Bukan dating back to between 4100 BC and 4400 BC. These artefacts confirm that Bukan was home to one of the first human settlements on the Iranian Plateau. Bukan was also at the centre of the Mannaean civilization.

In Pre–Islamic times Bukan was a garrison for both the Parthian Empire and the Sassanian Empire There are several ancient sites from this time period in Bukan today.

Islamic era
Bukan fell into the hands of the Muslims some time around 643. The city was part of the Mukriyan principality from the late 14th century to the 19th century. As the principality declined, aristocratic (agha) Dehbokri Kurds, who controlled many surrounding villages, took control over the city. The Dehbokri were staunchly against the Mukriyan principality. Despite its small size, Bukan played a major role in the region culturally and politically. In the mid-1940s, the city was incorporated into the short-lived Republic of Mahabad and acquired a printing press and Kurdish books and magazines were published. Later, the town experienced a peasant revolt wherein the peasants succeeded in forcing the  aristocrats out. The revolt was ultimately put down ruthlessly by the army.

Up until the 1950s, Bukan was considered a large village but has seen a rapid growth since then. Its population increased from 5,307 in 1956, to 20,579 in 1976 and 149,340 in 2006.

The people of Bukan took part in the Iranian Revolution in 1979 and in the subsequent Kurdish movement for autonomy. It fell under the control of Kurdish opposition groups, but was recaptured by the Iranian Army on 1 January 1984. According to the Islamic Revolutionary Guard Corps, Bukan was the last Kurdish city in Iran to be captured. On 15 April 1988, Bukan was bombarded by the Iraqi Air Force, in which 19 people died and 160 were wounded.

Historical sites

Sardar Castle 
In 1247 Persian Date, Sardar Aziz Khan Mokri from the Sardasht region built a castle near the great reservoir of Bukan that is presently named after its founder as Sardaar Aziz Khaan Castle. The castle was built on top of a hill 50 by 60 meters in diameter and 13 meters tall, and its main building material is 20 by 20 cm bricks with clay mortar and timbers. The castle measures 25 by 30 meters and has 6 daises which rest upon 9-storey columns 2 meters tall and 1 meter in diameter.

During 1325-1351 (A.H) the castle was turned into a police headquarters, post office, and a school respectively and finally was destroyed completely in 1361 A.H and replaced by a newly built structure that used as Basidj (Mobilization) Station.

Sports 
Football is the most popular sport in the city. Since 2000, Bukan has been host to the professional club Sardar Bukan F.C. which plays in the Iranian League 2 (third tier). In 2017, Sardar Bukan gained a nationwide reputation for its support from the people of Bukan.

Notable people
 Sardar Aziz Khan Mokri 
 Hasan Zirak
 Misbaholdiwan Adab
 Sadegh Sharafkandi
 Abdurrahman Sharafkandi
 Ghader Abdollahzadeh

References

External links

Bukan entry in the Encyclopædia Iranica
Mannaean glazed bricks from Bukan

Bukan County

Cities in West Azerbaijan Province

Populated places in West Azerbaijan Province

Populated places in Bukan County

Iranian Kurdistan

Kurdish settlements in West Azerbaijan Province